Gotane is a small village in the state of Maharashtra, India. It is located in the Dhule taluka of Dhule District in Maharashtra.

Location
Gotane is located on the Maharashtra Other District Road 98 (ODR98).

Demographics
As of 2001 census, Gotane had a population of 2,879 with 1,570 males and 1,309 females. Males constitute 54% of the population and females 46%. In Gotane, 1% of the population is under 6 years of age.

There are total of 495 households in the village and the village border area is spread in the area of 956 hectares.

Economy
Gotane farming economy is included in the states income & expenditure accounts. As for budget year 2007-2008 Gotane village had accounted for an income of Rs. 230,000.00 whereas the total expenditure was Rs. 230,000.00.

Administration
Gotane has as Village Gram Panchayat for day-to-day administration. The District Zilla Panchayat headquarters is at Dhule and the Block Panchayat is also at Dhule.

Gotane has no commercial banks, co-operative banks, agricultural credit societies, non-agricultural credit societies or other credit societies present within the village.

Drinking water facilities
Gotane has numerous drinking water facilities which are mainly available through a common tap or a common well. There are two wells and two hand pumps available within the village as drinking water sources.

Education Facilities
Gotane has one primary and one secondary school (R.G.V.Goatne). For all higher education, village students have to go to the bigger cities close by. There is also 1 government funded childcare and mother-care center (Anganwadi) within the village as part of the Integrated Child Development Services program started by the Indian government to combat child hunger and malnutrition in 1975.

Medical Facilities
Gotane has no medical facilities present within the village.

Communication Facilities 
Gotane has no postal, telegraph or telephone facilities within the village. The closest post office is at Chaugaon which is 3.2 km from the village.

Recreation & Cultural Facilities
Gotane has no recreational facilities, such as cinemas or video halls present within the village.

Gotane has no cultural facilities like sports-clubs, stadium or auditorium present within the village.

Transport

Rail
Gotane has no railway station of its own, the closest railway station is Dhule which is 12 km from the village.

Road
Gotane has bus station and direct state transport (ST) connectivity. Villagers have to rely on the local vehicles for transport to nearby towns.

Air
Gotane has no airport of its own, the closest airport is at Dhule.

See also
 Chaugaon
 Udane
 Dhule City
 Dhule District
 List of villages in Dhule District
 List of districts of Maharashtra
 Maharashtra

References

 Census Of India: 2001: Population for Village Code 00157700
 Government of India: Ministry of Panchayati Raj

Villages in Dhule taluka
Villages in Dhule district